Main Tera Hero is a 2014 Indian Hindi-language romantic action comedy film, directed by David Dhawan and produced by Shobha Kapoor and Ekta Kapoor under the Balaji Motion Pictures banner. It is a remake of the 2011 Telugu film Kandireega. The film stars Nargis Fakhri, Varun Dhawan and Ileana D'Cruz. Principal photography for the movie began on 30 May 2013, filming started on 5 July 2013 and was completed by 15 October. The film released on 4 April 2014 to mixed reviews from critics, though it became a box office success.

Plot
Across a college in Ooty, Sreenath Prasad aka 'Seenu'  fails his final exam by two marks. Eager to get a degree, he kidnaps the professor's daughter during her wedding and demands his professor to give him two more marks in exchange for his daughter. Seenu accidentally lets go of her however while letting his parents into his house, and his plan fails.

Although Seenu's father offers him a job at his shopping mall, Seenu plans to get a degree at Tift College in Bengaluru. He leaves Ooty on a train headed for Bengaluru. On the train, he beats up a gang harming a group of teenage girls. When Seenu arrives in Bengaluru, a friend of his who lives there reluctantly allows him to stay in his house.

Once Seenu arrives in Tift College, he prays to Krishna  to concentrate on nothing but studies. However, once he finishes, he sees a Middle - Class girl named Sunaina Goradia  and gets attracted to her. He tries to get her attention, but she ignores him constantly. She tells him that she has been forced into marrying a corrupt policeman named Angad Negi  since he tricked her father into shooting Angad's sidekick and friend Peter's arm. Angad's men chase Seenu until he beats up two of them and scares away the rest. Seenu goes to Angad to make a truce with him and leave Sunaina, but Angad (believing he cannot do it) gives Seenu a chance to try to woo Sunaina for up to three days. Seenu publicly tells Sunaina he loves her and tells her not to be afraid of Angad and his goons. She gains courage, scares off Angad's men, and falls in love with Seenu. Angad finds Seenu, finds out what happened, and attempts to shoot Seenu, but instead accidentally shoots Peter. The media quickly finds out and Angad gets suspended as a police officer.

All seems well until Sunaina is kidnapped and taken away in a helicopter. Seenu learns from Angad that Sunaina will be taken to the mansion of Vikrant Singhal  one of Asia's most notorious gangsters. Vikrant's daughter, Ayesha Singhal  was on the Ooty-to-Bangalore train Seenu was in and was attracted by his impressive fighting skills. She told her father about the experience as well as her interest in marrying him. Angad and Peter told Vikrant's men that in order to get Seenu, they would have to take Sunaina to lure him to their place, forcing Seenu to marry Ayesha.

Feeling helpless, Seenu goes to Vikrant's residence in Bangkok, Thailand. He tricks Vikrant and his friend and associate Balli  into thinking that he wants to marry Ayesha. However, he requests that he is given ten days to get to know Ayesha before the wedding day, which Vikrant initially refuses until Ayesha tells her father to "do as Seenu says". Ayesha and Seenu spend the day together; later, Seenu tells Ayesha that he does not love her. Later When Seenu met Sunaina and Try to Intimate with her she asks him to leave the house, but Fails.  When Angad and Peter come later, she then falls in love with Angad through a sheer coincidence. Seenu Likes  Ayesha As Wells he Likes Sunaina and never show differences.

Seenu and Sunaina use Ayesha's love for Angad as a way of solving their problem. Sunaina wears identical clothes to Ayesha; as a result, Angad confuses Sunaina for Ayesha, making Ayesha believe that Angad loves her. The plan later fails, though, when Angad realizes this and tricks Ayesha once again into marrying Seenu. Angad is tricked by Seenu and Sunaina into kissing Ayesha, when Vikrant sees this and points his gun at Angad to shoot him, but Ayesha steps in between and stops him saying that she loves Angad. Seeing this, Angad realizes that Ayesha's love for him is true and that Ayesha is the right girl for him, not Sunaina and decides to marry Ayesha. Vikrant realizes his daughter loves Angad and reluctantly tells Seenu that Ayesha will marry Angad. Seenu pretends to have agonized but celebrates later. Ayesha marries Angad, and Vikrant convinces Sunaina (who is also pretending to hate Seenu) to marry Seenu, by saying that he took 10 days to hatch a plan to bring Ayesha and Angad together, not to get to know Ayesha (not realizing that this is true) Seenu and Sunaina are back together again and get married.

Cast
 Varun Dhawan as Sreenath Prasad aka 'Seenu', Sunaina’s and Ayesha's love interest and later husband of Sunaina
 Ileana D’Cruz as Sunaina Sreenath Prasad, Seenu’s love interest turned wife 
 Nargis Fakhri as Ayesha Angad Negi (nee Singhal), Angad's wife 
 Arunoday Singh as Inspector Angad Negi, Sunaina's obsessive lover, Ayesha’s husband
 Anupam Kher as Vikrant Singhal and College Professor (Dual Role)
 Qadeer Sarwar as Khan 
 Rajpal Yadav as Peter, Angad's cop
 Saurabh Shukla as Balli, Vikrant's bodyguard
 Manoj Pahwa as seenu's father 
 Supriya Shukla as seenu's mother
 Evelyn Sharma as Veronica, Vikrant's girlfriend and Ayesha's adoptive  Mother
 Raju Kher as Professor Tripathi
 Neel Motwani as Angad's Goon 
 Shakti Kapoor as Johnny
 Ashwin Mushran as Anger Management Therapist 
 Kavish Majumdar as Seenu's college friend
 Salman Khan in a voiceover appearance as Various Gods

Production

Development
Production team wants the movie to capture it as a modern-day Himmatwala with a treatment like The Wedding Crashers. Nargis Fakhri dubbed in her own voice over for the first time in a Hindi language film which was stopping her due to language barriers.

Casting
Balaji Motion Pictures approached Varun Dhawan, Ileana D'Cruz and Nargis Fakhri as the main leads for the film and it was confirmed.

Filming
Initial filming began on 5 July 2013, the filming locations include Bangalore, Bangkok and London. Next schedule commenced in Bangkok October 2013 with the main cast. Number of songs for the movie has been choreographed by Bosco-Caesar in Bangkok. Anupam Kher was seen alongside main cast in a supporting role.

Soundtrack

The soundtrack was composed by Sajid–Wajid, while the lyrics were penned by Kumaar, Kausar Munir and Danish Sabri. The first song, Besharmi Ki Height, sung by Benny Dayal and Shalmali Kholgade, released on 20 February 2014. The soundtrack was released on 3 March 2014. The producers of the film capitulating on the popularity of the song "Palat – Tera Hero Idhar Hai" from the soundtrack attached a remix version of it along with the theatrical prints of Ragini MMS 2, which released on 21 March 2014—instead of the theatrical trailer—marking the first such instance. Some critics compared the track, "Palat – Tera Hero Idhar Hai" to the 1981 song, "Jahan Teri Yeh Nazar Hai", from the film Kaalia.

Reception 

Filmfare review given by Devesh Sharma gave 4 stars out of 5 and said "This breezy soundtrack offers a good antidote for dull evenings. One can say that Sajid-Wajid are certainly back in business. They might not have experimented much but have given us the classic Hindi film sound that has gone missing in today's times." Another 3 stars out of 5 was given by Joginder Tuteja from Rediff mentioning "The Main Tera Hero soundtrack has no dull moments. Songs like Palat and Besharmi keep the fun element intact right through."

Marketing

The film's official trailer was released online on 23 January 2014 with presence of the main cast. Positive responses came along for the young stars' vibe and one of the tabloid reviews compared the movie to Archie Comics characters. Arise India and PVR Cinemas collaborated to bring the star-cast of Main Tera Hero to the initial screening at MGF Metropolitan Mall in Saket, Delhi.

Promotional events for the film took place in various cities. As a part of the tour, the cast visited many colleges, malls, and news channels to promote their film. The cast made appearances at colleges and malls in Indore and then touring New Delhi, turned up at Delhi University's campus which saw thousands of youngsters turn up to see actors Varun Dhawan, Ileana D'Cruz and anchor Bharat Jain. They have reportedly disheartened at Nargis Fakhri's absence as she was shooting in Budapest.

Reception
On review aggregator website Rotten Tomatoes, the film holds an approval rating of 20% based on 5 reviews, and an average rating of 5/10.

Taran Adarsh of Bollywood Hungama gave the movie 3.5/5 stars and wrote, "On the whole, MAIN TERA HERO is a wild, wacky, madcap entertainer that has the unmistakable stamp of the master of entertainers – David Dhawan. An over the top plot, humor quotient and performances are three aces the film stands on. The film should work well with admirers of typical Bollywood masalathons, also because Varun Dhawan pulls off the act with flamboyance and bowls you over with an uproarious act in this zany entertainer. Go, have fun and laugh out loud!" Srijana Mitra Das of Times of India gave the movie 3.5/5 stars saying, Main Tera Hero is a pav bhaji picture, quick, spicy, hot. It has the depth of a comic strip but it also has its neon-shaded fun. For those who want a light laugh, here's your boy. Paloma Sharma of Rediff gave the movie 3.5/5 stars, and wrote, Main Tera Hero rests almost solely on the bases of strong performances extracted by a tough taskmaster, director David Dhawan—who makes a surprisingly clean film for the most part but doesn't seem to have been able to resist the temptation to indulge in a few less-than-tasteful jokes post-interval. The second half is primarily where the problem lies. The script dwindles slightly. Too many characters with too many subplots emerge, messing things up for a bit. Film Critic Subhash K. Jha gave the film 3 stars, saying ""Main Tera Hero" is a cleverly designed blues-chaser...While Varun Dhawan goes about the task of filling up the screen with his confident zest, David Dhawan ensures there is enough fuel to furnish the funnies with a furious tempo".

Mohar Basu of Koimoi praised the film, stating that, "Main Tero Hero transports you into a world of fun that we have been kept devoid of from weeks. Quick witted, jocular and pricelessly silly, this film is a sure shot must watch." She gave the film 3 out of 5 stars. Raedita Tandan of Filmfare rated the movie with 3 stars stating, "Main Tera Hero (MTH) is a textbook David Dhawan movie. This is the kind of low-brow humour you enjoy without pretensions. It's not great cinema but it is a paisa vasool comedy." Sarita Tanwar of DNA gave the movie 3/5 stars and said, "Main Tera Hero is a light-hearted entertainer, under two hours long which moves along at a brisk pace. Tushar Hiranandani has penned a mad script that will reel you in as soon as the credits end. If the industry was looking for a replacement for Govinda, then there isn't a better option than Varun." Saibal Chatterjee of NDTV gave the movie 2.5/5 stars and said that "Main Tera Hero is an action-packed romantic comedy that is peppered with vivacious performances, peppy musical set pieces, and a breezy and an unusual love triangle that eventually acquires an additional angle. The story, which is clearly only a pretext to hang the film's many gags on, delivers frantic twists and turns that strain credulity." Zee News Aparna Mudi, rated the movie 2.5/5 stars, stating, "The cast of the movie have definitely been given leverage to play their characters with ease, and performances are good all around. They also seem to have had a lot of fun with the movie, especially Varun, as he looks adorable pulling faces and romancing the two lead heroines. Highly entertaining in the first half, 'Main Tera Hero' slumps in the second. The jokes are slightly in-your-face and fail to make you laugh at times."

Abhishek Gupta of India TV gave it 2.5 stars and wrote, "Twists and turns in the climax look forcibly inducted to give a feeling of suspense, though, it doesn't work at all. The cop and the Don turning into comic characters were expected from it but despite all these hiccups, Main Tera Hero reaches its destination." The Hindustan Times Anupama Chopra gave the film 2 stars, saying, "There are a few moments in the film that took me back to the good old day. But mostly, Main Tera Hero is loud and tiring. The frenzied plot didn't deliver enough funny lines. The burden of making this enterprise work rests mostly with Varun, who is as hyper as a helium-filled energizer bunny. Meanwhile, the two svelte heroines – Ileana D'Cruz and Nargis Fakhri – simper about looking sexy. I just wish it had been more interesting". India Today gave the film 2 stars: "If this film was made to establish Varun Dhawan as a comedy actor who can do something different then they have achieved what they wanted. Because he does put a great show together but there is absolutely nothing else that deserves any compliments."

Box office
Main Tera Hero opened to an occupancy of around 40% in India. The film, which released alongside Captain America: The Winter Soldier, led in the morning shows in places like Rajasthan, Gujarat and CI while lost out to it in multiplexes of Kolkata, Delhi, Bangalore, Chennai and Mumbai. The film saw a major setback during evening shows in the first day of its release owing to the semi-final match between India and South-Africa collecting . The film collected another  on the second day of its theatrical release—taking its two-day total to —showing a considerable growth of 80%, which was expected considering the loss on its first day to the cricket match. On the third day it collected — to take its weekend total to — which though "high" by normal standards were understandable because of the cricket matches affecting its growth. On its first Monday it had a collection of around —. Overall the film had a decent first week collecting  domestically. Suffering a heavy drop of 75% the film collected  on its eighth day. From the Mumbai circuit—comprising the Gujarat-Saurashtra belts—alone it collected . It was declared a "Semi Hit" by Box Office India.

References

External links

Main Tera Hero at Bollywoodhungama.com

2010s Hindi-language films
2014 films
Hindi remakes of Telugu films
Films directed by David Dhawan
Films shot in Bangkok
Films shot in Ooty
Films shot in Bangalore
Films set in Tamil Nadu
Films set in Karnataka
Balaji Motion Pictures films